Pyrausta castalis is a species of moth in the family Crambidae. It is found in Russia, the Czech Republic, the Balkan Peninsula, Italy, France and Spain. It has also been recorded from Turkey.

The wingspan is about 16 mm.

References

Moths described in 1829
castalis
Moths of Europe
Moths of Asia